Cyprus competed at the 2022 Commonwealth Games at Birmingham, England from 28 July to 8 August 2022. It was Cyprus' 11th appearance at the Games.

Marios Georgiou and Zoi Konstantopoulou were the country's flagbearers during the opening ceremony.

Medalists

Competitors
It is expected that Cyprus will send 46 competitors to the Games.

The following is the list of number of competitors participating at the Games per sport/discipline.

Athletics

Men
Track and road events

Field events

Women
Track and road events

Field events

Badminton

Beach volleyball

On 26 September 2021, Cyprus guaranteed qualification for both the men's and women's tournaments by winning the European Qualifiers. The FIVB later confirmed the women ultimately qualified directly via the World Rankings (for performances between 16 April 2018 and 31 March 2022).

Men's tournament
Group C

Quarterfinals

Women's tournament
Group B

Quarterfinals

Boxing

Men

Cycling

Road
Men

Women

Mountain Biking

Gymnastics

Artistic
Men
Team Final & Individual Qualification

Individual Finals

Women
Individual Qualification

Individual Finals

Rhythmic
Team Final & Individual Qualification

Individual Finals

Judo

Cyprus entered six judoka (five men and one woman). Georgios Balarjishvili won Cyprus' first ever Commonwealth Games gold medal in the sport of judo.

Men

Women

Swimming

Men

Women

Table tennis

Cyprus accepted a Bipartite Invitation for the para table tennis competition and selected Pantelis Kailis to compete.

Singles

Doubles

Team

Triathlon

Individual

Weightlifting

Wrestling

See also
Cyprus at the 2022 Winter Olympics

References

External links
Birmingham 2022 Commonwealth Games Official site

Nations at the 2022 Commonwealth Games
Cyprus at the Commonwealth Games
2022 in Cypriot sport